The Waupaca Free Public Library is a historic Carnegie library located on Main Street in Waupaca, Wisconsin, United States.  It was built from 1913 to 1914 and designed by architects Parkinson and Dockendorff from La Crosse, Wisconsin.  The design combines elements of English Tudor Revival and American Arts and Crafts architectural styles.  The construction was funded with a grant from the Carnegie Corporation.  It was listed on the National Register of Historic Places in 1996.

References

Library buildings completed in 1914
Buildings and structures in Waupaca County, Wisconsin
Libraries on the National Register of Historic Places in Wisconsin
Tudor Revival architecture in Wisconsin
Carnegie libraries in Wisconsin
1914 establishments in Wisconsin
National Register of Historic Places in Waupaca County, Wisconsin